Yili Health Valley station is a station on Line 1 of the Hohhot Metro. The station is called Sanjianfang station during planning and construction. It serves as the western terminus of the line and opened on 29 December 2019.

References

Hohhot Metro stations
Railway stations in China opened in 2019